Holy Innocents Children's Hospital (HICH), is a pediatric general hospital in the  Western Region of Uganda. Founded in 2009, it is the second entirely pediatric hospital in the country, the other being CURE Children's Hospital of Uganda (CCHU), located in Mbale, in Eastern Uganda, which was founded in 2000.

Location

The geographical coordinates of Holy Innocents Children's Hospital are:00°37'23.0"S, 30°38'50.0"E (Latitude:-0.623056; Longitude:30.647222).

Overview
The hospital is a collaborative effort between many stakeholders, including the following:
1. The Roman Catholic Archdiocese of Mbarara 2. Uganda Catholic Medical Bureau 3. The University of San Diego School of Nursing & Health Sciences 4. The University of California, San Diego School of Medicine 5. The Children's Hospital Oakland 6. The Roman Catholic Diocese of San Diego 
7. California State University, Northridge 8. Rady Children's Hospital, San Diego 9. Private Businesspeople and Entrepreneurs 10. Donors and  Volunteers worldwide.

Operation
Holy Innocents Children's Hospital is a mender of the Uganda Catholic Medical Bureau. As of October 2020, the bed capacity was 55 beds. Annual outpatient visits were 20,468, with 3,922 annual admissions. Patient user fees accounted for 45.3 percent of the total hospital annual income.

External links
 Google Map Mbarara City

See also
Roman Catholic Archdiocese of Mbarara
Hospitals in Uganda

References

Hospital buildings completed in 2009
Hospitals in Uganda
Mbarara District
Hospitals established in 2009
2009 establishments in Uganda